Our Place is the debut album from acclaimed Fly My Pretties band member, Adi Dick. It was recorded in his bedroom and released by Loop Recordings Aotearoa in 2007.

Track listing

Band members
Adi Dick - Vocals, Instruments
Rio Hempo - Bass (on 'Sunshine' and 'Beautiful View')
Fulla Flash - Saxophone (on 'Get Out')

References

2007 albums
Adi Dick albums